The 2005 Walsh Cup was a hurling competition played by the teams of Leinster and Ulster. 8 teams competed: 5 Leinster counties, 2 Ulster counties and one third-level college. Lower-level teams competed in the 2005 Kehoe Cup.

Kilkenny won their first Cup in thirteen years.

Results

Quarter-finals

Semi-finals

Final

References

Walsh Cup
Walsh Cup (hurling)